Beti (lit: Daughter) is a Pakistani television series created by Abdullah Seja  under their production house Idream Entertainment. It is written by Sophia Khurram and directed by Mohsin Mirza. Saheefa Jabbar Khattak and Fahad Mirza star as Maryam and Azhar, respectively. The show began airing in December 2018.

Synopsis
Maryam (Saheefa Jabbar Khattak) is a bright university student who lives with her single mother. After a romantic courtship with her classmate Azhar (Fahad Mirza), she expresses her wish to marry him. Azhar's family consists of his tyrannical grandmother Shahana (Asma Abbas), his parents Hashim (Javed Sheikh) and Fareeda (Naima Khan), his older brother Taimoor (Hassan Ahmed) and Taimoor's pregnant wife Sonia (Zainab Ahmed). Azhar warns Maryam that his family is not like hers, but she accepts this challenge and the two are married. Maryam soon learns that she is expecting. When Sonia prematurely gives birth to a girl, she is coerced by the family into taking her daughter off life support because of her gender. Maryam is disgusted upon realizing that Shahana is a firm follower of a devious guru and wishes for only sons in the family. She fears for her future when she discovers that she is expecting a girl.

Cast
Saheefa Jabbar Khattak as Maryam
Fahad Mirza as Azhar, Maryam's husband
Asma Abbas as Shahana Dadi, Azhar and Taimoor's grandmother
Jawed Sheikh as Hashmat, Azhar and Taimoor's father
Naima Khan as Fareeda, Azhar and Taimoor's mother
Hassan Ahmed as Taimoor, Azhar's elder brother
Zainab Ahmed as Sonia, Taimoor's wife
Abeer Qureshi as Naila, Azhar's 2nd wife
Ismat Zaidi as Maryam's mother
Farah Nadir as Shahana's friend

Production
In an earlier interview with The Express Tribune, Khattak said about the character she will be playing, "My character’s in-laws have a conservative mindset and are adamant on their preference of a boy over a girl. There is a sigh of relief as her husband is supportive and has a different mindset from his family."

Awards and nominations

References

External links
Official website

2018 Pakistani television series debuts
Urdu-language television shows
Pakistani drama television series